Jacqueline Marta Weinstein Levy (born 12 April 1948) is a Chilean economist who served as minister during the first government of Michelle Bachelet (2006–2010).

References

1948 births
Living people
Chilean people of Jewish descent
University of Chile alumni
21st-century Chilean politicians
Party for Democracy (Chile) politicians